Al Coates (born in Leduc, Alberta) is a Canadian radio broadcaster. He is the play-by-play announcer for the Edmonton Prospects, and previously the Edmonton Trappers and the Edmonton Cracker-Cats. He has been broadcasting since 1980 and was general manager of the Edmonton Cracker-Cats for the 2007 season.

References

 

Living people
Canadian radio sportscasters
People from Leduc, Alberta
Year of birth missing (living people)